The 1991 San Miguel Beermen season was the 17th season of the franchise in the Philippine Basketball Association (PBA).

Draft pick

Notable dates
March 19: Import Ricky Wilson, who also came in last season's third conference as a replacement, torched the hoops with 57 points as San Miguel snapped the Ginebras' two-game winning run with a 112-109 victory. The Beermen improved to four wins and three losses while Ginebra dropped to three victories against four defeats. 

July 2: San Miguel Beermen pull off an easy 102-91 triumph over Alaska that sent them two games closer to a semifinal seat in the All-Filipino Conference. 

September 22: Import Andrew Moten scored 69 points and hitting 12 triples to lead the Beermen to their second victory in the Third Conference, a 125-123 win over Shell on Ato Agustin's last-second basket.

October 13: Ato Agustin's jumper with a second remaining lift San Miguel to a 126-124 win over Swift as the Beermen tied the Mighty Meaties in the standings with an even four wins and four losses. New Import Larry Robbins topscored for the Beermen with 54 points. 

October 27: San Miguel avoided playoff complications and booked the fourth semifinals seat of the Third Conference with their sixth win in 11 games on a hassle-free 138-132 victory over also-ran Purefoods Tender Juicy Hotdogs. 

November 10: Jay Taylor, the fourth Beermen import to arrived, sizzled with 72 points in leading San Miguel to a 141-128 win over Tivoli Milk at the close of the first round of the semifinals. The Beermen moved two games ahead of the Milkmasters with their eight victory in 15 games.

Occurrences
In San Miguel's third outing in the Third Conference against Alaska, Import Andrew Moten blew his top on the physical defense put up by the Milkmen over him and deserted his team during the halftime break, he later return to finish the game. Moten's emotional outburst resulted to the Beermen's 92-111 loss to Alaska. Moten lambasted league officials and was immediately sent home by San Miguel management to protect their image, he was promptly banned by the PBA thereafter.

Roster

Transactions

Additions

Rookie free agents

Recruited imports

References

San Miguel Beermen seasons
San